The Men's Allam British Open 2017 is the men's edition of the 2017 British Open Squash Championships, which is a PSA World Series event (Prize money : 150,000 $). The event took place at the Airco Arena in Hull in England from 19 to 26 March. Grégory Gaultier won his third British Open trophy, beating Nick Matthew in the final.

Seeds

Draw and results

See also
2017 Women's British Open Squash Championship
2017 Men's World Open Squash Championship

References

2010s in Kingston upon Hull
Men's British Open
Men's British Open
March 2017 events in the United Kingdom
British Open Squash Championship
Men's British Open Squash Championships
Men's sport in the United Kingdom
Sport in Kingston upon Hull
Squash in England